Pigs may refer to members of the domestic pig subspecies, the Sus genus that includes the domestic pig, or the family Suidae that contains Sus.

 List of suines: species in the suborder Suina, which includes Suidae and Tayassuidae (peccaries)
 List of individual pigs: notable individual domestic pigs
 List of fictional pigs: fictional pigs
 List of pig breeds: breeds of domestic pigs